The 2015 Parramatta Eels season is the 69th in the club's history. Coached by Brad Arthur and captained by Tim Mannah, they competed in the NRL's 2015 Telstra Premiership.

Summary
Before the start of the 2015 season, the club were hit with the news that star player Jarryd Hayne would be terminating his contract in order to pursue a career in the NFL. However, in the opening round of the season, Parramatta recorded an impressive 42-12 victory over Manly. The club would only go on to win a further two games and by round 11 sat bottom of the table. During the losing streak, Parramatta suffered narrow losses including the round 10 defeat against the New Zealand Warriors in golden point extra-time. Parramatta lost the match 17-13 with Luke Kelly missing three conversion attempts including one right next to the uprights.

In round 13 of the competition, Parramatta lead North Queensland 30-6 with 20 minutes left to play but would go on to lose 36-30 after North Queensland scored five tries in 12 minutes. Parramatta recovered by then winning three games in succession to lift them away from last place. Parramatta would win two of their remaining eight matches to finish 12th. Towards the end of the season, winger Semi Radradra broke the clubs most tries in a season record with 24 tries.

Standings

National Rugby League

National Youth Competition

Fixtures

Auckland Nines

Home and away season

Players and staff

Transfers

In:

Out:

References

Parramatta Eels seasons
Parramatta Eels season